Osteochilus kerinciensis is a species of cyprinid fish. It is endemic to Sumatra (Indonesia). It is known from the upper reaches of the Batang Hari River basin, including upstream tributaries and highland lakes. The specific name kerinciensis refers to its type locality, Lake Kerinci.

Osteochilus kerinciensis grows to  standard length.

References

Further reading
Kottelat, Maurice, and Tan Heok Hui. "Osteochilus flavicauda, a new species of fish from the Malay Peninsula (Teleostei: Cyprinidae)." Ichthyological Exploration of Freshwaters 20.1 (2009): 1.
Murni, Mida Yulia, and Dewi Imelda Roesma. "Inventarisasi Jenis-Jenis Ikan Cyprinidae di Sungai Batang Nareh, Kabupaten Padang Pariaman." Jurnal Biologi Universitas Andalas 3.4 (2014).

Osteochilus
Cyprinid fish of Asia
Freshwater fish of Sumatra
Endemic fauna of Sumatra
Taxa named by Maurice Kottelat
Taxa named by Heok Hui Tan
Fish described in 2009